Playskool is an American company that produces educational toys and games for children. It is a subsidiary of Hasbro, Inc., and is headquartered in Pawtucket, Rhode Island.

History 
The Playskool Institute was established by Lucille King in 1928 as a division of the John Schroeder Lumber Company in Milwaukee, Wisconsin. King, an employee at the company, developed wooden toys to use as teaching aids for children in the classroom.  In 1935, the Playskool Institute became a division of Thorncraft, Inc., and established offices in Chicago, Illinois.  In 1938, Playskool was purchased by the Joseph Lumber Company, where Manuel Fink was placed in charge of operations.  In 1940, Fink, along with Robert Meythaler, bought Playskool and established the Playskool Manufacturing Company.

In 1943, Playskool bought the J.L. Wright Company, the manufacturer of Lincoln Logs. In 1958, Playskool merged with Holgate Toys, Inc., a wood product manufacturer based in Kane, Pennsylvania. In 1962, they purchased the Halsam Company, a producer of wooden blocks, checkers, dominoes, and construction sets. In 1968, Playskool became a subsidiary of Milton Bradley; both companies were acquired by Hasbro, Inc. in 1984.

After the acquisition, Playskool began operating out of Pawtucket, Rhode Island as a division of Hasbro. In 1985, Playskool released a line of infant products under the Tommee Tippee brand name, including bibs and bottles. Many Hasbro products targeted at preschoolers were rebranded with the Playskool name, including Play-Doh and Tonka. Playskool also began licensing toys from other designers, creating licensing agreements to manufacture Teddy Ruxpin, Barney, Arthur, Teletubbies, and Nickelodeon branded products. Hasbro also began licensing the Playskool brand name to other vendors, manufacturing a number of products under the Playskool name, including books, baby care supplies, video games, and children's apparel.

Products
Playskool produces many lines of educational toys and games for children.  Playskool's signature brands and toys include Mr. Potato Head, Tonka, Alphie, Weebles, Elefun, Sesame Street toys, and Gloworm.

Playskool creates products for newborn to preschool-aged children; products like the Kick Start Gym, Step Start Walk 'n Ride, and the Tummy Time line are aimed at developing the motor skills of babies. Several toys, like Playskool's Pipeworks, Go Go Gears, and Busy Basics lines, were created to allow children to express creativity. Playskool also produces several dolls and action figures, including Dolly Surprise and Kota the Triceratops.

During the 1970s, Playskool also released a toy series named "Familiar Places" which included several toy buildings along with vehicles and toy people, including a McDonald's restaurant, Holiday Inn hotel and Texaco gas station.

Playskool has released toys based on Television Programmes aimed at young children like Sesame Street, Top Wing, In the Night Garden..., Boohbah, Bob the Builder and Rubbadubbers.

Playskool heroes toys feature characters from various properties in a scale more suited for younger children. These figures are similar to Imaginext.

These properties include:

 Star Wars
 Marvel
 Transformers: Rescue Bots
 Power Rangers
 Jurassic Park (2015)

Brands 
Playskool brands include:

 Allegra's Window (1994-2006)
 Arthur (1996-2000)
 Baby Einstein
 Barney (1993-1999, moved to Fisher-Price)
 Bob the Builder (2000-2004)
 Boohbah (2004-2006)
 Bragnam
 Caillou (1997-2004)
 Chappy (1972-1985)
 Chuck and Friends
 Clipo
 Cool Crew
 Definitely Dinosaurs
 Dragon Tales (1999-2000, moved to Fisher-Price)
 The Furchester Hotel (Late 2010s (Europe))
 Genius Quiz Machine
 Glo Friends
 Go-Bots
 Gullah Gullah Island (1994-2006)
 In the Night Garden... (2007-2010s)
 Jurassic Park Junior (2015-2017, moved to Fisher-Price)
 Jurassic World Dino Tracker
 Marvel Super Hero Adventures
 Mister Frosty
 Mr. Potato Head
 Moon and me
 Noodleboro
 Peppa Pig (2021-present, moved from Fisher Price)
 Pipeworks
 PJ Masks (2021-present, moved from Just Play)
 Poppin' Park
 Power Rangers (2019–present)
 Rubbadubbers (2004-2006)
 Sesame Street (2011-2022, moved to Just Play)
 Sid the Science Kid (2008-2013)
 Speedstars
 Stanley (2002-2006)
 Star Wars Galaxy Heroes
 Star Wars Jedi Force
 Super Monsters
 Talk 'n Play
 Teletubbies (1998-2006)
 Top Wing (2017-2020)
 Tweenies (2000-2004)
 Transformers: Rescue Bots (2011–Present)
 Weebles
 Wheel Pals

Slogans

References

External links 
 Playskool website at Hasbro
 Official website

1928 establishments in Wisconsin
1968 mergers and acquisitions
1984 mergers and acquisitions
American companies established in 1928
Companies based in Rhode Island
Construction toys
Hasbro brands
Hasbro products
Hasbro subsidiaries
Pawtucket, Rhode Island
Toy companies established in 1928